The one-cent coin was the smallest-denomination coin of the Hong Kong dollar since 1866 until its replacement in 1941 by the one-cent note. During World War II the loss of coins dated 1941 along with their subsequent melting during the Japanese occupation of Hong Kong has resulted in the survival of no more than 100 coins.

Design 
Throughout its history the coin's initial design remained unchanged, constantly featured the text  '香港一仙' surrounded by its translation 'HONG KONG ONE CENT' while its obverse displayed the current reigning British monarch. It total the coins has displayed four different monarchs: Queen Victoria,  Edward VII and George V and George VI. 

After a number of trial strikes the copper-based coin was released in 1863, weighing 7.5g and having a diameter of 27.8mm. In order to save money the coin was debased in 1902 switching from copper to bronze and further reduced in size twice under the reign of George V.

Mintage Figures
Mintmarks
 H = Heaton

References

 Ma Tak Wo 2004, Illustrated Catalogue of Hong Kong Currency, Ma Tak Wo Numismatic Co., LTD Kowloon Hong Kong. 

Coins of Hong Kong
One-cent coins